is a Japanese media franchise created by manga artist Mine Yoshizaki. The first project was a mobile game developed by Nexon, which ran from March 2015 to December 2016. A manga by Furai was serialized in Kadokawa's Monthly Shōnen Ace from May 2015 to March 2017. A second game of the series was released by Bushiroad in January 2018. An anime television series produced by Yaoyorozu aired from January to March 2017; the anime was co-financed and licensed by Crunchyroll. A second season by Tomason aired from January to April 2019.

Plot
Japari Park is a large zoo that is home to extant species, endangered species, extinct species, cryptids, and some legendary creatures.

The manga follows a park keeper named Nana who looks after the various characters in Japari Park. The manga is set earlier than the rest of the works in the franchise.

In the Nexon mobile game, the park has been closed to visitors due to an outbreak of aggressive and amorphous creatures known as "Ceruleans", which the Friends have to battle with the help of the player and the park guide, Mirai.

In the first season of the anime, which is set sometime after the mobile game, a girl wakes up in Japari Park with no recollection of who she is or how she got there. She encounters a serval Friend, who names the girl "Kaban". Together, they set out on an adventure to find out what kind of animal Kaban is, passing through multiple regions of Japari Park and meeting new friends along the way.

Characters

Kemono Friends

Main characters

The main protagonist of the anime series. She is a young girl who finds herself in Japari Park with no memory of who she is or where she is from. Her name was given to her by Serval due to the backpack she carries. Shy yet resourceful, she travels through Japari Park along with Serval to find out her identity while encountering more Friends along the way, eventually discovering that she is a human. She is the only character with whom Lucky Beast will directly communicate. In Kemono Friends 2, she reappears as an adult, working alongside the owls to research the phenomenon of Ceruleans.

A serval cat that was originally from the Savannah Area of Japari Park. She is the first friend to meet Kaban, eager to join her in the search for her identity. Energetic and curious, Serval is often amazed by the skills and talents of Kaban and the Friends they encounter on their journey. She reappears as a main character in Kemono Friends 2, though appears to have lost her memory of her time with Kaban.

Key Friends

A fennec fox who accompanies Raccoon as she pursues Kaban and Serval.

A raccoon who is chasing after Kaban and Serval, believing that she stole something from her. In the Japanese version, she calls herself "Arai-san" instead of using the first-person pronoun.

 and 
,Yuka Aisaka
A reoccurring character in the manga series. An Ezo red fox who is rather lazy and enjoys eating Japari buns.

 and 

Kemono Friends 2

 
 The main protagonist of Kemono Friends 2, named after the sound of his stomach grumbling. He emerged from a mysterious laboratory in Japari Park, with his only clue home being a sketchbook.

A caracal who appears alongside Serval in Kemono Friends 2.

 and 

A giant armadillo and giant pangolin – respectively nicknamed Alma and Sen – who work as detectives who will take on any request in exchange for food.

 and 

A greater lophorina and western parotia.

Other characters

While he does not respond to the Friends themselves, he will directly answer questions and statements made by Kaban, providing information on Japari Park, Friends, and needed items when trouble arises.

A park guide who worked at Japari Park when it was still open and adores animals. During her time at the park, she recorded various reports which are played through Lucky Beast. A different Serval worked alongside Mirai when Japari Park was open.

African Wild Dog is a member of a group of Cerulean Hunters.

The main protagonist of the manga, who works as a caretaker at Japari Park.

Media

Video games

The first smartphone app by Nexon launched in Japan in March 2015, running until its service was shut down on December 14, 2016, one month prior to the anime's premiere. Nexon initially stated that there were no plans to restart the service despite the popularity of the anime series, although the company later announced that, while a return is possible, no final decision on a game relaunch has been made.

On April 23, a new game in development by Bushiroad was announced. On August 14, its name was revealed to be , and will be a simulation game. Originally meant to be released in late 2017, the release date was pushed back to January 26, 2018.

Kemono Friends Picross, a picross game developed by Jupiter, was released internationally for Nintendo Switch on October 4, 2018.

The third smartphone app Kemono Friends 3, by Sega launched in Japan on 24 September 2019. Sega later transferred the publishing rights to Appirits. The arcade version Kemono Friends 3 Planet Tour was launched on 26 September 2019 and shut down on 30 September 2021.

On April 16, 2020, Nexon launched a crossover event, Kemono Friends × Mabinogi.

Manga
A manga illustrated by Furai, titled , began serialization in Kadokawa Shoten's Shōnen Ace magazine from May 2015. The first tankōbon volume was released on December 26, 2016. At their panel in Anime Expo, Yen Press announced their license to the manga. In April 2018, Tokyopop released the German version of the manga on July 26, 2018.

Another manga series, Kemono Friends: À La Carte, which began serialization in 2017, was licensed by Yen Press in 2019. It is an anthology series, compiling stories and illustrations by various artists, with the second volume at one point being the highest selling book on Amazon Japan in August 2017.

A manga adaptation of Kemono Friends 2 began serialization in Monthly Shōnen Ace on January 26, 2019.

Anime

The anime television series, produced by Yaoyorozu, aired in Japan between January 10, 2017, and March 28, 2017; the anime was simulcast by Crunchyroll, which co-financed and licensed the anime series. Original content for TV Tokyo's AniTele service was released from April 1, 2017. An unofficial "episode 12.1" 2-minute short was uploaded by the director to Niconico and YouTube on April 5, 2017. Additional shorts have been created in collaboration with Japan Racing Association, Animelo Summer Live 2017, and Nissin Foods. Discotek Media distributed the series for Crunchyroll in North America, and produced an English dub by Sound Cadence Studios. The full English dub cast had been announced at Otakon 2019, and released on Blu-ray on September 24, 2019.

A second anime season was announced to be greenlit for production on July 26, 2017, and was officially confirmed on September 2, 2018. The second season is animated by Tomason, with Ryuichi Kimura and Takuya Matsumoto replacing Tatsuki as director and writer, respectively. The rest of the cast and staff reprised their roles. The second season aired from January 14 to April 1, 2019. The opening theme is "Notteke~ Japari Beat," by Dōbutsu Biscuits×PPP. The ending theme from episodes 1–5 is "Hoshi o Tsunagete" by Gothic×Luck. From episode 6-onwards, Gothic×Luck performed the series' second ending theme "Kimi wa Kaeru Basho." A short anime titled Kemono Friends 3 has been greenlit for production.

An original net animation mini-series based on the original mobile game, titled , began streaming on TV Tokyo's AnimeTele service from August 10, 2018. Crunchyroll began streaming the series from October 16, 2018.

Stage play
A stage play adaptation of Kemono Friends with an original storyline ran at the Shinagawa Prince Hotel Club eX in Tokyo from 2017 June 14 to 18. Hiroki Murakami directed the play and penned the script while some of the characters were portrayed by the same actors who voiced them in the anime series. It ran again in 2018 from January 13 to 21.

Reception

Anime

Season one
The show's CGI animation initially received criticism for its quality and style. One critic expressed dissatisfaction on Twitter, stating that he stopped watching the show partway through the first episode. However, the show's popularity grew significantly after the fourth episode. In reference to the simplistic and repetitive nature of the show, it has been described by critical bloggers as "causing one's IQ to melt" and "lowering one's intelligence". Despite the low production quality, the anime series was praised by some critics and viewers in Japan for its storyline and characters, becoming a cultural phenomenon in the country. Nick Creamer of Anime News Network gave the series an overall grade of B, praising the worldbuilding and criticizing the visual aspects.

The first episode of Kemono Friends received a high number of views on NicoNico Douga. The show surpassed 1 million views by February 5, 5 million views by April 4, and eventually reached a record-breaking 10 million views by August 24.

The opening theme song "Yokoso Japari Park e" rose to 3rd place in the iTunes charts upon release. It was revealed on May 20 that "Yokoso Japari Park e" had reached gold status (sales of 100,000+ in Japan).

NHK's news Check 11 reported an increase in the number of zoo visits that might have been inspired by viewers of Kemono Friends. The franchise took part in several promotional events with zoos and other establishments, including displaying boards featuring anthropomorphized animals from the show near real-life animals.

Season two
The reception to season two of Kemono Friends among Japanese audiences was mixed. Some criticized the anime for leaving foreshadowed plot points unresolved. Episodes 9 and 12 of Kemono Friends season two received a lot of negative feedback, with the latter becoming the least positively rated anime episode on NicoNico Namahousou at 2.6%. Despite the negative reactions, first episode reactions were generally positive, and some viewers liked both seasons.

Awards

Controversies

Dispute between Kadokawa and Yaoyorozu
On September 25, 2017, the director of the anime, Tatsuki, revealed on Twitter that Kadokawa had decided to replace him for the production of the second season; fan response included immense condemnation of Kadokawa and widespread support of Tatsuki, as Tatsuki is regarded as being a highly instrumental part of the anime's charm and success. Fans left angry comments en masse towards Kadokawa on Niconico Douga's stream of the first episode, with some declaring that they would cancel their Niconico Douga premium membership with the service in response to Tatsuki's firing, as Dwango [Niconico's owner] and Kadokawa are both child companies of Kadokawa Dwango. The Nikkei reported that stock prices for Kadokawa Dwango fell by 3.3% compared to the previous day at the Tokyo Stock Exchange as a result of the news. In the weeks before this incident animation studio Yaoyorozu had released a free teaser side episode to its fans, pursuant to their agreement with Kadokawa that Yaoyorozu would be allowed full creative freedom in developing Kemono Friends, an agreement made at a time where the Kemono Friends IP appeared to be near worthless, an agreement they wished to change in response to the soaring value of the IP. In response to the controversy, production committee of the Kemono Friends anime announced that director Tatsuki and the animation studio Yaoyorozu had been using the Kemono Friends property on its own without consulting all concerned parties and that Yaoyorozu would not agree to a normalization in communication and withdrew from the project as a result. A September 26 Kemono Friends streaming program on Niconico Douga then featured several voice actresses from the anime publicly apologizing for the ongoing controversy, despite having little connection to the corporate decisions made. This led to further backlash against Kadokawa, with accusations that they had used the actresses to deflect blame from the company itself.

On December 27, 2017, Yoshitada Fukuhara, the animation producer, confirmed that Yaoyorozu would ultimately not go on to produce the second season.

Tatsuki has also claimed on Twitter on September 14th, 2018 that he was never paid for his involvement with writing the script, or any of the royalties concerning the anime. TV Tokyo's producer for this anime, Nobuyuki Hosoda, responded to fan questions on Twitter stating that he couldn't provide an answer based on the position that he was in.

Anime setting and drawing plagirism allegations 
Concerns rose among Internet users on February 2, 2018 that the then-upcoming game, Kemono Friends Puzzle Gokko, was plagirizing artwork and setting from the first season of the anime without the consent of Tatsuki. Yoshitada Fukuhara weighed in on this as well, stating that he was never informed of this matter and that he would look in to it. 3 weeks later, both the Kemono Friends official Twitter account and later on a press release by the developer of Puzzle Gokko issued an apology for the troubles caused and that any legal issues surrounding such issues were resolved.

Audition script plagirism controversy 
On September 2, 2018, the second season of Kemono Friends was once again announced on their official website and casting calls were published for a new idol unit related to the show. However, it was quickly revealed by the owner of a website called Mezasou! Seiyu that the sample script for the upcoming audition was lifted from the website without the required proper crediting. The offending script was taken down the following day, and Eiji Kato, one of the producers of Kemono Friends, offered an apology on Twitter and offered to also apologize to the website owner in person but was turned down.

Season 2 producer SNS controversy
After the end of the second season, TV Tokyo released an apology statement in regards to a staff member's behavior on SNS services and their behavior towards viewers. This apology was thought to be about the season 2 producer, Nobuyuki Hosoya, and later confirmed to be about him by TV Tokyo's Yukio Kawasaki. Hosoya had been accused of making taunting and agitating comments towards critics of Kemono Friends 2 on Twitter and making fun of their comments. Hosoya admitted to his actions being inappropriate. Hosoya was later transferred completely away from anime related work by TV Tokyo, and ultimately leaving TV Tokyo completely, with his name disappearing from all anime he was involved in. Although TV Tokyo claimed it was only part of a regularly planned reshuffle of personnel, he had previously only worked in anime-related work.

Legal concerns over Blu-ray purchase benefits 
Concerns of misrepresentation were raised by fans on promotional materials for the official Blu-ray discs of Kemono Friends 2. Consumers pointed out that no mentions were made to the fact that the "purchase benefit" listed on promotional materials failed to make mention of the fact that an additional commission was required to apply for such benefits via postal money order, leading to complaints and concerns over whether the production committee breached the "Act against Unjustifiable Premiums and Misleading Representations" (不当景品類及び不当表示防止法). KADOKAWA issued an apology and correction statement on June 7, 2019 on the official website of Kemono Friends 2, stating that the benefits will be free and that anyone who already paid in would be refunded.

References

External links
 Official anime website 
  
 

 

2017 anime television series debuts
2019 anime television series debuts
2015 video games
2017 controversies
2018 controversies
2019 controversies
2017 plays
2018 video games
Adventure anime and manga
Android (operating system) games
Animated television series about birds
Animated television series about cats
Animated television series about foxes
Animated television series about penguins
Anime and manga controversies
Bushiroad
Comics about animals
Crunchyroll anime
Discotek Media
Free-to-play video games
IOS games
Inactive multiplayer online games
Incremental games
Internet memes introduced in 2017
Japanese children's animated comedy television series
Japanese computer-animated television series
Japanese plays
Kadokawa Dwango franchises
Kadokawa Shoten
Kadokawa Shoten manga
Kemonomimi
Manga based on video games
Mass media franchises
Nexon games
Post-apocalyptic anime and manga
Role-playing video games
Shōnen manga
Single-player online games
TV Tokyo original programming
Television series about raccoons
Video games about birds
Video games about cats
Video games about foxes
Video games about raccoons
Yaoyorozu
Yen Press titles
Animated television series about animals
Fiction about zoos
Fictional cats
Fictional penguins
Fictional foxes
Fictional raccoons
Fictional owls
Fictional hippopotamuses
Fictional otters
Fictional birds
Fictional snakes
Fictional camelids
Fictional armadillos
Fictional dogs
Fictional bears
Fictional pinnipeds
Fictional wolves
Fictional Columbidae
Fictional ducks
Fictional passerine birds
Fictional deer and moose
Fictional bovids
Fictional pandas
Fictional elephants
Fictional dolphins
Fictional Tasmanian devils
Fictional kangaroos and wallabies
Fictional turtles
Fictional crocodilians
Fictional lizards
Fictional tapirs
Fictional koalas
Fictional rodents
Fictional polar bears
Fictional giraffes
Fictional horses
Fictional sheep
Fictional porcupines
Fictional rabbits and hares